Ab Garm-e Bala (also Romanized as Āb Garm-e Bālā; also known as Āb-e Garm, Ābgarm, and Āb-i-Garm) is a village in Baqerabad Rural District, in the Central District of Mahallat County, Markazi Province, Iran. At the 2006 census, its population was 11, in 8 families.

References 

Populated places in Mahallat County